Prattville High School, formerly Autauga County High School, is a high school in Prattville, Alabama, United States. It forms part of the Autauga County School System. In 2010, it had an enrollment of 2,109 students and a faculty of 103 teachers in grades 9-12. In 2014, it had 2,057 students and 98 teachers. In 2018, there were 2,066 students, 101 teachers, and 5 administrators.
 
The Autauga County Technology Center shares the same campus.

Clubs

Available clubs on campus include Advanced Placement Group, Archery, Art Honors, Beta Club, Debate Team, Diamond Dolls, FBLA, Fellowship of Christian Students, French Club, H.E.E.L.S., Jr. Civitan, JROTC, Model United Nations, Movie Club, Mu Alpha Theta, National Honor Society, PHS Broadcasting, Prattville Pals, PROM, RTI Resources, Science Olympiad, SGA, Spanish Club, Spanish Honor Society, Sports Medicine, Student Ambassadors, Suicide Prevention Organization, and Yearbook. The Fine Arts department includes the Prattville High School Band (The Pride of Prattville), Prattville Theatre, Spotlight Show Choir and Art Honor Society.

Autauga County Technology Center 
The Autauga County Technology Center is a technical program that works in part with the surrounding schools in the county. The ACTC offers career clusters that can help improve a student's success in the workforce. It allows students to partake in a co-op program, allowing the students time during their school hours to go and shadow local affiliates. Some examples of the clusters offered are: Agriconstruction, Business Technology, Finance, Fire Science, Family and Consumer Science, STEM, Automotive Services, Educational Training, Welding, Health Sciences, and Cosmetology.

Notable alumni 
 Marlon Anderson, MLB player (class of '92)
 Kaitlan Collins, CNN White House Correspondent (class of 2010)
 Evan Crawford, MLB player (class of '05)
 Bobby Greenwood, NFL player (class of '05)
 Roman Harper, NFL player (class of '01)
 Ian Jackson, (football) University of Alabama Football Player (class of 2021)
 Nick Perry, NFL player and coach (class of 2009)
 Kamryn Pettway, NFL player (class of 2014)
 Courtney Smith, NFL player (class of '06)
 Kevin Turner, NFL player (class of '87)
 Zac Woodfin, NFL player (class of '01)

References

External links 
 Prattville High School website
 Autauga County Schools Website
Autauga County Technology Center Website

Public high schools in Alabama
Prattville, Alabama
Educational institutions established in 1976
Schools in Autauga County, Alabama
1976 establishments in Alabama